This is the discography of British new wave band Sigue Sigue Sputnik.

Albums

Studio albums

Compilation albums

Video albums

Singles

Other releases
 1986: The 12" Mixes ("Rockit Miss USA" (Remix)/"She's My Man" (Remix)/"Interview" (12" and cassette limited release – 1000 copies given away free with the album Flaunt It at HMV)
 1987: "Rio Rocks" (7" promo split with "Unchain My Heart" by Joe Cocker – only released in Argentina)
 1988: "Hey Jane Mansfield Superstar!" (12" promo – only released in Brazil)

Other album appearances
 1986: Armed & Dangerous OST (includes the SSS track "She's My Man")
 1989: Rude Awakening OST (includes the SSS track "Success")
 1990: David Bowie Songbook (free CD included with magazine and includes the SSS version of "Rebel Rebel")
 1990: A Tribute to Prince: Party O' the Times (includes the SSS version of "I Could Never Take the Place of Your Man")
 2000: Virgin Voices: A Tribute to Madonna – Volume Two (includes the SSS version of "Ray of Light")
 2000: Don't Blow Your Cover: A Tribute to KMFDM (includes the SSS version of "Virus")
 2000: Covered in Nails: A Tribute to Nine Inch Nails (includes the SSS version of "Piggy")
 2001: A Gothic–Industrial Tribute to Smashing Pumpkins (includes the SSS version of "Bullet with Butterfly Wings")
 2002: A Tribute to Johnny Thunders: I Only Wrote This Song for You (includes the SSS version of "Personality Crisis")
 2005: Tribute to Thunderbirds – 40th Anniversary Special (includes the SSS version of "Thunderbirds Are Go!")
 2005: This Is Not Retro (includes the SSS track "Pussywhipper")
 2011: All Time Super Guest by Hotei (featuring the collaboration with SSS on the track "C'mon Everybody")
 2016: Ferris Bueller's Day Off OST (includes the SSS track "Love Missile F1-11")
 2016: Say I'm Your Number One: Stock, Aitken & Waterman (30 CD Box Set includes a 10 track EP of the SSS track "Success")

References

Discographies of British artists
Rock music group discographies
New wave discographies